Bantock House Museum and Park, is a museum of Edwardian life and local history, with  of surrounding parkland in Wolverhampton, England. It is named after Alderman Baldwin and Kitty Bantock who once lived there. It is run by Wolverhampton City Council's Arts and Museums service.

History
The house was built in the 1730s as New Merridale Farm. It was extended and improved during occupancy by Thomas Herrick about the beginning of the 19th century and renamed Merridale House. The house had several tenants but in about 1864 was bought by Thomas Bantock, a canal and railway agent. His son Albert Baldwin Bantock, who was twice Mayor of Wolverhampton and also High Sheriff of Staffordshire in 1920, further improved the property following his father's death in 1896. On his own death, without children, in 1938 he bequeathed the house and park to Wolverhampton Corporation. The house was renamed in his honour in 1940.  It is a Grade II listed building.

Bantock House

Bantock House contains displays exploring the  lives of the Bantock family and other locally important people.  On the ground floor, there are displays about the Bantock family and the way they lived. Upstairs, the focus shifts to the men and women who shaped Wolverhampton and the industries they created with displays featuring locally-made enamels, steel jewellery and japanned ware. The museum is unusual in that it avoids for the most part the use of traditional 'glass case' displays, and instead presents a 'more informal and imaginative setting'; visitors are, for example, encouraged to sit on any furniture they can find.

Bantock House Gardens

The gardens that surround the house were designed by Albert Baldwin Bantock and in 1998 were restored to his original designs by Wolverhampton City Council, allowing visitors today to see the different spaces Baldwin created.  At the back of the house there is a sunken garden called the Dutch Garden. There is also a rose garden, with an array of roses with names such as Blythe Spirit, Chapeau de Napoleon and Glamis Castle, colourful flower borders in the house garden and a woodland garden which now forms part of a nature trail around the park.

Bantock Park
Bantock Park has  of land and includes a play area for children, a small, 18 hole golf course, a putting green, and football fields.

Highland cattle were bred by the Bantock family and are believed to have roamed the grounds of the park up until around the 1930s. To recreate the presence of the cows, local craftsman Neil Watt was commissioned to create a cow sculpture, which can now be seen at the front of the house.

References

External links

Wolverhampton Arts and Museums Service: Bantock House and Park
Wolverhampton's Listed Buildings - Bantock House Museum, outbuildings and Bantock Park
BBC: The Black Country: 360° views: Bantock House and Park

Grade II listed buildings in the West Midlands (county)
Historic house museums in the West Midlands (county)
Gardens in the West Midlands (county)
Parks and open spaces in the West Midlands (county)
Local museums in the West Midlands (county)
Museums in Wolverhampton
Museums established in 1938
1938 establishments in England
Conservation areas in England